John Bauler was alderman of the 22nd ward of the Chicago City Council, consisting at the time of the western half of the Near North Side and the southwestern quadrant of Lincoln Park, from 1912 to 1920. He was the brother of Mathias 'Paddy' Bauler, who would serve as alderman of the same area from 1933 to 1967 when it was part of the 43rd ward.

References

Year of birth missing
Year of death missing
Chicago City Council members